Petrophile septemfida is a species of flowering plant in the family Proteaceae and is endemic to southwestern Western Australia. It is a shrub with leaves usually with seven lobes divided almost to the midrid, and spherical heads of cream-coloured to pale yellow flowers on the ends of branchlets.

Description
The flowers are arranged on the ends of branchlets in sessile, spherical heads  in diameter, with narrow egg-shaped involucral bracts at the base. Flowering occurs from late June to early October and the fruit is a nut, fused with others in a more or less spherical head  in diameter.

Taxonomy
Petrophile septemfida was first formally described in 2011 by Barbara Lynette Rye and Kelly Anne Shepherd in the journal Nuytsia from material collected near Badgingarra by Michael Clyde Hislop in 2008. The specific epithet (septemfida) means "seven-cleft", referring to the leaves.

Distribution and habitat
This petrophile mainly grows in shrubland in the area between Tathra National Park, Coorow and Watheroo National Park in the southwest of Western Australia.

Conservation status
Petrophile septemfida is classified as "Priority Three" by the Government of Western Australia Department of Parks and Wildlife meaning that it is poorly known and known from only a few locations but is not under imminent threat.

References

septemfida
Eudicots of Western Australia
Endemic flora of Western Australia
Plants described in 2011
Taxa named by Barbara Lynette Rye